Caladenia arenicola, commonly known as the carousel spider orchid, is a plant in the orchid family Orchidaceae and is endemic to the south-west of Western Australia. It is a common species on the Swan Coastal Plain, where it grows in sandy soil under trees.

Description
The dorsal sepal is erect and the lateral sepals and petal spreads widely and have narrow scent-producing glands on their ends. Flowering occurs between late August and October and is followed by a non-fleshy, dehiscent capsule containing a large number of seeds.

Taxonomy and naming
Caladenia arenicola was first formally described by Stephen Hopper and Andrew Brown in 2001 from a specimen collected near Wanneroo. The description was published in Nuytsia. The specific epithet (arenicola) is derived from the Latin words arena meaning "sand", and -cola meaning "dweller" referring to the sandy habitat of this orchid.

Distribution and habitat
Carousel spider orchid occurs between Lancelin and Yarloop in the Jarrah Forest and Swan Coastal Plain biogeographic regions where it grows in sandy soil in Allocasuarina, Eucalyptus or Banksia woodland.

Conservation
Caladenia arenicola is classified as "not threatened" by the Western Australian Government Department of Parks and Wildlife.

References

arenicola
Endemic orchids of Australia
Orchids of Western Australia
Plants described in 2001
Taxa named by Stephen Hopper
Taxa named by Andrew Phillip Brown